Ekiti United is a professional association football club based in Ekiti State. It plays in the Nigeria national league, a second division of Nigeria football league.

History

References 

Nigeria National League
Football in Nigeria